Stonewater Golf Club is a semi-private regulation golf course and facility built in 1996 in Highland Heights, Ohio. Sixteen of the eighteen holes have water hazards which necessitated 23 wooden bridges. The course is also well wooded, with seventy sand bunkers. Its par is 71. The course is designed around the residential neighborhood of Aberdeen.

Nationwide Tour
The course has a three-year contract (2005-2007) with the Nationwide Tour, in which the golf course holds a stop of the tour during the summer.

Titles
 2005 - Cleveland Open. Was not aired on TV.
 2006 - Legend Financial Group Classic. Aired August 31 - September 3 on The Golf Channel.
 2007 - Legend Financial Group Classic. To be aired July 5–8 on The Golf Channel.

References
 Official Site
 Entry for Stonewater on Golflink
 Correct Nationwide Tour event name is Legend Financial Group Classic as of July 2006

Buildings and structures in Cuyahoga County, Ohio
Golf clubs and courses in Ohio
1966 establishments in Ohio